Nguyễn Văn Lộc (24 August 1922 – 31 May 1992) was a South Vietnamese educator, lawyer, and politician who served as Prime Minister of South Vietnam between 9 November 1967 and 18 May 1968.  His second wife, Nguyễn Thị Mai, would be the subject of a biography, Black Silk Pajamas in 2000.  Lộc attempted to leave Vietnam 14 times before successfully making it to Singapore in May 1983 as a refugee. He died in Paris, France in May 1992 at the age of 69.

Early life and education
Nguyễn Văn Lộc was born on 24 August 1922, in Long Chau village, Chau Thanh district - Vinh Long, (now Vinh Long City, Vinh Long Province) to a wealthy family. He obtained a bachelor's degree in law from the University of Montpellier, France in 1954 and a master's degree in criminal law from the University of Paris, France in 1964.

Early career
In 1945, he participated in the Anti-French War of Resistance, commonly known as the First Indochina War, which he served as the editor-in-chief of an underground newspaper called La Lutte. After realizing the communist nature of the Việt Minh, he left and returned to Saigon, publishing and printing newspapers.

Political career
Since 1955, he has been a lawyer of the Saigon High Court.
In 1964, Lộc was elected Chairman of the Civil-Military Council (Hội Đồng Dân Quân, the legislature during the transition from a military government to an elected government). In 1967, Nguyễn Cao Kỳ invited Lộc to join him in the 1967 South Vietnamese presidential election as his running mate, being the vice presidential candidate. After deciding to run jointly with Nguyễn Văn Thiệu, being his running mate as the vice presidential candidate, Kỳ asked Lộc to withdraw. To compensate Lộc, Kỳ asked Thiệu to appoint Lộc as the prime minister of the government.

Prime Minister of South Vietnam (1967-1968)
In November 1967, he was appointed by President Thiệu to be the first Prime Minister of the Second Republic of Vietnam. In mid-November 1967, Prime Minister Lộc presented his cabinet:

 Foreign Minister: Doctor Trần Văn Đỗ
 Defense Minister: Lieutenant General Nguyễn Văn Vy
 Interior Minister: Lieutenant General Linh Quang Viên
 Minister of Rural Construction: Lieutenant General Nguyễn Đức Thắng
 Economic Minister: Trương Thái Tôn
 Finance Minister: Lưu Văn Tính
 Minister of Culture and Education: Professor Tăng Kim Đồng
 Minister of Labor: Professor Phó Bá Long
 Minister of Health: Doctor Trần Lữ Y
 Minister of Public Works: Bửu Đôn
 Minister of Justice: Huỳnh Đức Bửu
 Minister for Ethnic Development: Paul Nur
 Minister of Agriculture and Land: Tôn Thất Trình
 Minister of Social Affairs and Refugees: Dr. Nguyễn Phúc Quế
 Transport Minister: Lương Thái Siêu
And two Ministers in charge of other areas.
Deputy Ministers are Phạm Đăng Lâm (Diplomacy), Trần Lưu Cung (Education; in charge of Universities and Specializations), Professor Lê Trọng Vinh (Education; in charge of First, Secondary and High School), Law. Professor Hồ Thới Sang (Education; in charge of School Youth), Professor Bùi Xuân Bào (Culture), Nguyễn Chánh Lý (Commerce), Võ Văn Nhung (Technology). Professor Nguyễn Văn Tường and Đoàn Bá Cang hold the positions of Ministers of the Prime Minister's Office.

After the 1968 Tet Offensive, he was criticized and forced to resign. Since then, he has stopped doing politics and has turned to teaching : 1969, teacher, Hoa Hao University, An Giang (Vietnam), 1971, director, Cao Dai University, Tai Ninh (Vietnam).

Fall of Saigon
On 30 April 1975, when South Vietnam collapsed to the advancing forces of North Vietnam and the Viet Cong, Lộc like other high-ranking government and military officials of the Saigon government that stayed behind were sent to re-education camp operated by the new Communist Vietnamese government. In an interview with the New York Times, Lộc describes in the re-education camps he and other inmates were forced to perform hard labor such as clearing the jungles, swamps, and minefields to building dams and farming. He mentions the conditions of the camps were so brutal that two or three people within the camps would die every week from malnutrition or illnesses 
In 1980, after spending five brutal years in the re-education camp, the Communist government decided to let Lộc return to Saigon (now Ho Chi Minh City). Lộc explains, 

I nearly died in the labor camp, where I was kept with about 1,500 others on a near starvation diet, they let me return to Saigon in 1980 only after they felt that I was dying.

References

1922 births
1992 deaths
South Vietnamese politicians
Prime Ministers of South Vietnam
Vietnamese emigrants to Singapore